K-11 was a Soviet  (Project 627A) nuclear-powered attack submarine that had two reactor accidents during loading of the nuclear reactor core in Severodvinsk on 7 and 12 February 1965. Reasons for the accidents included nonobservance of operating instructions by those participating in the lift of the reactor cover and the mistaken decision to continue refueling after the first accident. There were no fatalities but those accidents (ejection of radioactive steam and inappropriate fire extinguishing methods on 12 February) caused an unsafe release of radiation into the environment and nearby shipyard area. Seven men were treated for exposure to radiation. The reactor compartment holding the two damaged reactors was removed, partially decontaminated and sunk in Abrosimov Bay (east coast of Novaya Zemlya) in the Kara Sea in 1966. A new reactor compartment was installed and the submarine continued to perform her duties from August 1968 (performed five long-range cruises in 1968–1970 including patrol missions in the Mediterranean Sea, four long-range cruises in 1975–1977, five long-range cruises in 1982–1985) until decommissioning on 19 April 1990. K-11 passed the milestone of 220,179 miles traveled in 1988. The submarine has been laid up in Gremikha Bay since of 2000.

References

External links
 Bellona Report on Project 627, 627 A (Kit) November Class Submarines
 Federation of American Scientists – Project 627 Kit November Class Submarines 
 Describes the 1965 incident that occurred on 7 and 12 February

November-class submarines
Ships built in the Soviet Union
1961 ships
Cold War submarines of the Soviet Union